In algebraic geometry, a Châtelet surface is a rational surface studied by  given by an equation

where P has degree 3 or 4.  They are conic bundles.

References

Algebraic surfaces
Complex surfaces